The Senior women's race at the 1992 IAAF World Cross Country Championships was held in Boston, Massachusetts, United States, at Franklin Park on March 21, 1992. Conditions were cool with snow on the ground. Lynn Jennings won her third consecutive World Cross Country title.

Complete results, medallists, 
 and the results of British athletes were published.

Race results

Senior women's race (6.37 km)

Individual

Teams

Note: Athletes in parentheses did not score for the team result

Participation
An unofficial count yields the participation of 127 athletes from 35 countries in the Senior women's race.  This is in agreement with the official numbers as published.

 (4)
 (5)
 (4)
 (5)
 (5)
 (2)
 (1)
 (5)
 (4)
 (1)
 (1)
 (1)
 (6)
 (6)
 (1)
 (4)
 (4)
 (6)
 (1)
 (4)
 (6)
 (5)
 (1)
 (3)
 (1)
 (6)
 (2)
 (1)
 (1)
 (6)
 (5)
 (6)
 (2)
 (6)
 (6)

See also
 1992 IAAF World Cross Country Championships – Senior men's race
 1992 IAAF World Cross Country Championships – Junior men's race
 1992 IAAF World Cross Country Championships – Junior women's race

References

Senior women's race at the World Athletics Cross Country Championships
IAAF World Cross Country Championships
1992 in women's athletics